The common watersnake (Nerodia sipedon) is a species of large, nonvenomous, common snake in the family Colubridae. The species is native to North America. It is frequently mistaken for the venomous cottonmouth (Agkistrodon piscivorus).

Common names
Common names for N. sipedon include banded water snake, black water adder, black water snake, brown water snake, common water snake, common northern water snake, eastern water snake, North American water snake, northern banded water snake, northern water snake, spotted water snake, streaked snake, water pilot, and water snake.

Description
The largest females can weigh up to  while the largest males can scale .

N. sipedon can be brown, gray, reddish, or brownish-black. It has dark crossbands on the neck and dark blotches on the rest of the body, often leading to misidentification as a cottonmouth or copperhead by novices. As N. sipedon ages, the color darkens, and the pattern becomes obscure. Some individuals become almost completely black. The belly also varies in color. It can be white, yellow, or gray; usually, it also has reddish or black crescents.

The common watersnake is nonvenomous and harmless to humans, but superficially resembles the venomous cottonmouth. It is often killed by humans out of fear; killing snakes greatly increases the chance of being bitten. The two can be easily distinguished: the watersnake has a longer, more slender body and a flattened head the same width as the neck, round pupils, and no heat-sensing pits. The cottonmouth has a fatter body, a wedge-shaped head with prominent venom glands that are wider than the neck, cat-like pupils, and heat-sensing pits between the eyes and the nostrils.

Colubrid snakes also have flat scales on their heads, while vipers all possess smaller, rugose scutes.

Subspecies
These four subspecies are recognized as being valid:
N. s. insularum   – Lake Erie watersnake
N. s. pleuralis  – midland watersnake
N. s. sipedon  – northern watersnake
N. s. williamengelsi  – Carolina watersnake

Geographic range
The common watersnake is found throughout eastern and central North America, from southern Ontario and southern Quebec in the north, to Texas and Florida in the south. Since at least 1992, this species, along with  N. fasciata, has been introduced in California, where they are considered invasive species likely to compete with native giant garter snake Thamnophis gigas.

Behavior

N. sipedon is active during the day and at night. It is most often seen basking on rocks, stumps, or brush. During the day, it hunts among plants at the water's edge, looking for small fish, tadpoles, frogs, worms, leeches, crayfish, large insects, salamanders, other snakes, turtles, small birds, and mammals . At night, it concentrates on minnows and other small fish resting in shallow water. It hunts using smell and sight. The Lake Erie watersnake subspecies, N. s. insularum, was once endangered, but now benefits from the introduction of the round goby, an invasive species, which constitutes up to 90% of its diet.

The common watersnake is common over most of its range and is frequently seen basking on stream banks, from which it dives into the water at the slightest disturbance. It is quick to flee from danger, but if cornered or captured, it usually does not hesitate to defend itself. Larger specimens can inflict a painful bite.

Reproduction
The common watersnake mates from April through June. It is ovoviviparous (live-bearing), which means it does not lay eggs like many other snakes. A female may have as many as 30 young at a time, but the average is eight. They are born between August and October. Mothers do not care for their young. Multiple mating by females is common, leading to a focus in sperm competition. Research suggests successful males are not the ones who dedicate more energy to size, but to sperm.

Defense against predators
N. sipedon has many predators, including birds, raccoons, opossums, foxes, snapping turtles, other snakes, and humans. The common watersnake defends itself vigorously when threatened. If picked up by an animal or person, it will bite repeatedly, and release excrement and musk. Its saliva contains a mild anticoagulant, which can cause the bite to bleed more, but poses little risk to humans.

Habitats
N. sipedon inhabits streams, lakes, and ponds, as well as wetlands. Juveniles typically inhabit lower-order streams adjacent to the larger-order waterways where adults are found. This helps juveniles to avoid predators such as fish, birds, and turtles present in large water bodies.

Conservation status
The Lake Erie watersnake, which occurs mainly on the lake's western islands offshore from Ohio and Ontario, recovered to the point where on August 16, 2011, the U.S. Fish and Wildlife Service removed it from the Federal List of Endangered and Threatened Wildlife. The subspecies was first listed as threatened in 1999 after a decline due to eradication by humans, as well as habitat loss and degradation. When initially listed, the subspecies’ population had dropped to only 1,500 adults. The introduction of an invasive species, the Eurasian round goby (Neogobius melanostomus) into Lake Erie in the mid-1990s became a new food source for the Lake Erie watersnake. By 2009, the population recovered to 11,980 snakes, safely exceeding the population minimum goal of 5,555 adult snakes required by the 2003 recovery plan. Monitoring was to occur for 5 years following this delisting. The Lake Erie watersnake is just the 23rd species or subspecies to be removed from the list due to recovery.

Gallery

References

Further reading
Conant R, Bridges W (1939). What Snake Is That? A Field Guide to the Snakes of the United States East of the Rocky Mountains. (With 108 drawings by Edmond Malnate). New York and London: D. Appleton-Century. Frontispiece map + viii + 163 pp. + Plates A-C, 1-32. (Natrix sipedon sipedon, pp. 98–101 + Plate 18, Figure 51).
Holbrook JE (1842). North American Herpetology; or, A Description of the Reptiles Inhabiting the United States. Vol. IV. Philadelphia: J. Dobson. 138 pp. + Plates I-XXXV. (Tropidonotus sipedon, pp. 29–31 + Plate VI).
Linnaeus C (1758). Systema naturæ per regna tria naturæ, secundum classes, ordines, genera, species, cum characteribus, differentiis, synonymis, locis. Tomus I. Editio Decima, Reformata. Stockholm: L. Salvius. 824 pp. (Coluber sipedon, new species, p. 219). (in Latin).
Morris PA (1942). Boy's Book of Snakes: How to Recognize and Understand Them. A volume of the Humanizing Science Series edited by Jacques Cattell. New York: Ronald Press. viii + 185 pp. (Natrix sipedon, pp. 78–81, 180).
Powell R, Conant R, Collins JT (2016). Peterson Field Guide to Reptiles and Amphibians of Eastern and Central North America, Fourth Edition. Boston and New York: Houghton Mifflin Harcourt. xiv + 494 pp. . (Nerodia sipedon, pp. 420–421 + Plate 41 + photo on p. xiv).
Smith HM, Brodie ED Jr (1982). Reptiles of North America: A Guide to Field Identification. New York: Golden Press. 240 pp.  (paperback). (Nerodia sipedon, pp. 156–157).
Wright AH, Wright AA (1957). Handbook of Snakes of the United States and Canada. Ithaca and London: Comstock Publishing Associates, A Division of Cornell University Press. 1,105 pp. (in 2 volumes) (Natrix sipedon, pp. 510–544, Figures 150-161, Map 42).
Zim HS, Smith HM (1956). Reptiles and Amphibians: A Guide to Familiar American Species: A Golden Nature Guide. New York: Simon and Schuster. 160 pp. (Natrix sipedon, pp. 102–103, 156).

External links
Northern Watersnake, Davidson College
Northern Watersnake, Reptiles and Amphibians of Iowa
 Common Watersnake - Nerodia sipedon

Nerodia
Reptiles of the United States
Reptiles of Ontario
Snakes of North America
Extant Cenozoic first appearances
Reptiles described in 1758
Taxa named by Carl Linnaeus